Leonardo Wiernes (born 1 February 1963) is an Argentine volleyball player. He competed in the men's tournament at the 1984 Summer Olympics.

References

External links
 

1963 births
Living people
Argentine men's volleyball players
Olympic volleyball players of Argentina
Volleyball players at the 1984 Summer Olympics
Place of birth missing (living people)
Pan American Games medalists in volleyball
Pan American Games bronze medalists for Argentina
Medalists at the 1983 Pan American Games